Aporocactus is a genus of cacti in the tribe Hylocereeae native to Mexico. It used to be classified as a subgenus in Disocactus, but according to molecular evidence, it should be excluded from Disocactus and treated as a separate genus.

Description
It is an epiphytic genus growing on the branches of trees, but without parasitizing them. Occurs as drooping or creeping stems up to 60 cm with 6 ribs covered with many small thorns.

Extant Species
There are two species in the genus Aporocactus:

References

External Links

Hylocereeae
Cactoideae genera